Quanteisha Benjamin, often referred to as Q-Benjamin, is a Canadian R&B singer.

Early life
Quanteisha grew up in Edmonton, Alberta. In 2008 she entered the local singing competition Bounce Showdown, held by contemporary hit radio station 91.7 The Bounce (CHBN-FM), becoming the fourth winner.

Singing career
After being signed with HipJoint Productions, out of Vancouver, Q recorded two songs in 2008, "Cover Girls" and "Get Loose". "Cover Girls" would get licensed for use on the sitcom 'da Kink in My Hair, and a music video. In 2009 she released "Someday" and "D'n'G", and "Someday" was used in the sitcom Gigantic. Also in 2009, a "Get Loose" remix was featured in the American Pie Presents: The Book of Love comedy film. Her single, "Stars", has won a Juno Award for R&B/Soul Recording of the Year.

Discography
Discography for Q-Benjamin FKA Quanteisha.

Singles

Music videos

Awards and nominations

|-
|2011 ||"D'n'G" ||Canadian Radio Music Award for dance/urban/rhythmic song ||
|-
|2011 ||"Stars" ||Juno Award for R&B/soul recording of the year ||
|}

References
Q-Benjamin leaves the temptation of Toronto for real love back home in Alberta  Edmonton Journal. Canada.com. Feb. 10, 2021.

Living people
21st-century Black Canadian women singers
Canadian contemporary R&B singers
Juno Award for R&B/Soul Recording of the Year winners
Musicians from Edmonton
Year of birth missing (living people)